Zvezdan Milošević (born 22 April 1964) is a Bosnian-born Swedish professional football manager and former player.

Playing career
Milošević was born in Sarajevo, SFR Yugoslavia. He started playing football at a young age and his first club was hometown team Željezničar. He played for minor clubs in the former Yugoslavia and Italy, before coming to Sweden in 1989 for a trial with Djurgårdens. He didn't get a contract but instead started to play for minor clubs in the Stockholm region, like Väsby IK, Assyriska FF and Café Opera.

Managerial career
Milošević started his managerial career in 2000 as an assistant at Essinge.

In 2017, he joined Lithuanian A Lyga club Utenis Utena, signing a three-year contract with it. Despite leading the team into 5th place in the league, Milošević was the first manager who had to leave a club in the mid-season of the 2017 A Lyga, after being sacked on 24 April 2017.

On 1 October 2019, he was appointed as sporting director of Montenegrin First League club Budućnost Podgorica.

References

External links
Zvezdan Milosevic at Footballdatabase

1964 births
Living people
Footballers from Sarajevo
Yugoslav emigrants to Sweden
Swedish football managers
FK Utenis Utena managers
Najran SC managers
OFK Grbalj managers
Saudi First Division League managers
Swedish expatriate football managers
Expatriate football managers in Lithuania
Swedish expatriate sportspeople in Lithuania
Expatriate football managers in Saudi Arabia
Swedish expatriate sportspeople in Saudi Arabia